This is a list of neighborhoods in Queens, one of the five boroughs of New York City.

Northwestern Queens 

 Astoria
 Astoria Heights
 Ditmars
 Steinway
 Little Egypt
 Jackson Heights
 Long Island City
 Blissville
 Hunters Point
 Dutch Kills
 Queensbridge (housing development)
 Queensview (housing development)
 Queens West
 Ravenswood (housing development)
 Sunnyside
 Sunnyside Gardens
 Woodside

Southwestern Queens 

 The Hole
 Howard Beach
 Hamilton Beach
 Howard Park
 Lindenwood (housing development)
 Old Howard Beach
 Ramblersville
 Rockwood Park
 Ozone Park
 South Ozone Park
 Tudor Village
 Richmond Hill
 Woodhaven

Central Queens 

Briarwood
Corona
LeFrak City (housing development)
North Corona
 East Elmhurst
 Elmhurst
 Forest Hills
 Forest Hills Gardens
 Fresh Pond
 Glendale
 Jackson Heights
 Kew Gardens
 Maspeth
 Middle Village
 Rego Park
 Ridgewood
Wyckoff Heights

Northeastern Queens 

 Bayside
 Bay Terrace
 Bayside Hills
 Fort Totten
 Oakland Gardens
 Bellerose
 College Point
 Douglaston–Little Neck
 Douglaston
 Douglas Bay
 Douglas Manor
 Douglaston Hill
 Douglaston Park
 Winchester Estates
 Little Neck
 Pines
 Little Neck Hills
 Westmoreland
 Flushing
 Broadway-Flushing
 Bowne Park 
 Chinatown
 Downtown Flushing
 Koreatown
 Linden Hill
 Murray Hill
 Willets Point
 Pomonok
 Electchester
 Queensboro Hill
 Floral Park
 Auburndale
 Kew Gardens Hills
 Fresh Meadows
 Hillcrest
 Utopia
 Glen Oaks
 North Shore Towers (housing development)
 Whitestone
 Beechhurst
 Clearview
 Malba

Southeastern Queens 

 Bellaire
 Brookville
 Cambria Heights
 Hollis
 Hollis Hills
 Holliswood
 Jamaica
 Jamaica Estates
 Jamaica Hills
 South Jamaica
 Rochdale Village (Cooperative Housing Development)
 St. Albans
 Laurelton
 Meadowmere
 Queens Village
 Rosedale
 Springfield Gardens
 Warnerville

The Rockaways 

 Arverne
 Bayswater
 Belle Harbor
 Breezy Point
 Broad Channel
 Edgemere
 Far Rockaway
 Hammels
 Neponsit
 Rockaway Beach
 Rockaway Park
 Roxbury
 Seaside

Postal mail, ZIP Codes, and neighborhoods 
Unlike neighborhoods in the other four boroughs, some Queens neighborhood names are used as the town name in postal addresses. For example, whereas the town, state construction for all addresses in Manhattan is New York, New York (except in Marble Hill, where Bronx, New York is used), and all neighborhoods in Brooklyn use Brooklyn, New York, residents of College Point would use the construction College Point, New York or Flushing, New York instead of Queens, New York.

From the time of the inception of the ZIP Code system until 1998, the postal zones of Queens and western Nassau County—whose secession from Queens County in 1899 did not affect postal routes—were organized based on which main post office routed the neighborhood's postal mail. The name of the main post office was the default name of the corresponding ZIP Code. For example, Fresh Meadows postal mail was routed through the main post office in Flushing, and Fresh Meadows' ZIP Codes 11365 and 11366 were both labeled as "Flushing". 

At the urging of the citizens of Queens and with the support of Congressman Gary Ackerman, ZIP Codes are also named after the main post office they serve. The original ZIP Codes themselves are still used by the USPS for mail delivery purposes. Queens neighborhoods may have one of the following ZIP Code prefixes, which are classified under the following main post offices:

 111: Long Island City
 113: Flushing
 114: Jamaica
 116: Rockaway

See also

 List of Bronx neighborhoods
 List of Brooklyn neighborhoods
 List of Manhattan neighborhoods
 List of Staten Island neighborhoods
 Community boards of Queens

References

External links

 'NYC Neighborhoods Map' from New York City’s Department of City Planning (DCP)
 Map of Queens neighborhoods

Queens
Queens neighborhoods
Queens